Perryville may refer to a location in the United States:

Communities
Perryville, Alaska
Perryville, Arkansas
Perryville, Indiana
Perryville, Kentucky
Battle of Perryville, in the American Civil War
Perryville, Maryland
Perryville, Missouri
Perryville, New Jersey
Perryville Tavern, listed on the NRHP in Hunterdon County, New Jersey
Perryville, New York
Perryville, Tennessee
Perryville, Texas (disambiguation)

Buildings
Arizona State Prison Complex - Perryville, a prison in Goodyear, Maricopa County
Perryville (McAlester, Oklahoma) on the list of NRHPs in Oklahoma

See also
 Perrysville